This is a list of rivers in Africa. See below each river's article for its tributaries, drainage areas, etc.

Southern Africa 
 Cuanza - Angola
 Great Fish River - South Africa
 Great Kei River - South Africa
Black Kei River - South Africa
White Kei River - South Africa
 Groot River(s) - South Africa
 Groot River (Western Cape)
 Groot River (Southern Cape)
 Groot River (Eastern Cape)
 another name for the Orange River - South Africa, Lesotho, Namibia
 Gamtoos River - South Africa
 Ihosy River - Madagascar
 Jukskei River - South Africa
 Kafue River - Zambia
 Kowie River - South Africa
 Kuiseb - Namibia
 Kunene - Angola (as Cunene), Namibia
 Kwando - Namibia, also known as Linyanti and Chobe in places
 Limpopo - Mozambique, South Africa, Zimbabwe, Botswana
 Luangwa River - Zambia
 Mania River - Madagascar
 Maputo River - South Africa, Eswatini, Mozambique
 Molopo - Botswana, South Africa
 Mooi River (Tugela) - South Africa
 Mthatha River - South Africa
 Okavango - Botswana, Namibia, Angola (as "Cubango")
 Onilahy River - Madagascar
 Orange - South Africa, Lesotho, Namibia
 Caledon - South Africa, Lesotho
 Vaal - South Africa
 Fish - Namibia
 Shangani River - Zimbabwe
 Swakop River - Namibia
 Tugela - South Africa
 Umfolozi River - South Africa
 Black Umfolozi River - South Africa
 White Umfolozi River - South Africa
 Umgeni River - South Africa
 Umkomazi River - South Africa
 Zambezi - Angola, Zambia, Namibia, Zimbabwe, Mozambique
Gairezi - Zimbabwe, Mozambique

Central Africa
 Chari - Central African Republic, Chad, Cameroon
Logone - Central African Republic, Cameroon
 Kagera River - Burundi, Rwanda, Tanzania, Uganda
 Congo - Angola, Democratic Republic of the Congo, Republic of the Congo
 Ebola River - Democratic Republic of the Congo
 Kasai - Angola, Democratic Republic of the Congo, Republic of the Congo
 Kwango - Angola, Democratic Republic of the Congo
Sankuru - Democratic Republic of the Congo
 Lualaba - Democratic Republic of the Congo
 Lomami - Democratic Republic of the Congo
 Ubangi - Democratic Republic of Congo, Republic of Congo, Central African Republic
 Lulonga - Democratic Republic of the Congo
Lopori - Democratic Republic of the Congo
Maringa - Democratic Republic of the Congo
Tshuapa - Democratic Republic of the Congo
 Uele - Democratic Republic of the Congo
 Nyabarongo River - Rwanda
 Rurubu River - Burundi
 Ruzizi River - Democratic Republic of the Congo, Rwanda, Burundi
 Mbomou - Central Africa Republic
 Wouri - Cameroon
 Xufexufe River - São Tomé and Príncipe

East Africa
Tana - Kenya
Athi - Kenya
Mara - Kenya and Tanzania
Ewaso - Nyiro-Kenya
Sondu - Mirio-Kenya
Ruvuma - Tanzania
Rufiji - Tanzania
Ruvu - Tanzania
Shebelle - Somalia and Ethiopia
Jubba - Somalia and Ethiopia
Nile - Uganda, Ethiopia, South Sudan, Sudan and Egypt 
Sezibwa - Uganda

West Africa
 Aba - Nigeria
 Bandama River
 Benue - Nigeria
 Cavalla River - Liberia
 Gambia - The Gambia, Senegal, Guinea
 Kolenté (Great Scarcies) - Guinea, Sierra Leone
 Little Scarcies (Kaba) - Guinea, Sierra Leone
 Moa - Guinea, Sierra Leone
 Niger - Nigeria, Benin, Niger, Mali, Guinea
 Oba - Nigeria
 Ose - Nigeria
 Osun - Nigeria
 Oteghelli - Nigeria
 Oueme - Benin
 Rokel - Sierra Leone
 Saint Paul - Liberia
 Sanaga - Cameroon
 Sankarani - Mali
 Senegal - Senegal, Mauritania, Mali
 Sewa River
 Volta - Ghana, Burkina Faso
 Cross River (Nigeria) - Nigeria
 Nuon River - Liberia, Ivory Coast
 Cestos River - Liberi

North Africa

 Nile - Egypt, Sudan, Ethiopia. 6,650 km
 Atbarah River - Sudan, Ethiopia
 Blue Nile - Sudan, Ethiopia
 Didessa River - Ethiopia
 Nile - Egypt
 Bahr el Zeraf - South Sudan
 White Nile - Sudan, South Sudan, Rwanda, Tanzania, Uganda
 White Nile - Sudan, South Sudan 
 Bou Regreg - Morocco. 240 km
 Draa River - Morocco. 1100 km
 Moulouya River - Morocco. 520 km
 Oum Er-Rbia River - Morocco. 555 km
 Sebou River - Morocco. 496 km
 Chelif River - Algeria. 725 km

See also
 Geography of Africa
 List of rivers of Europe
 List of rivers of Asia
 List of rivers of the Americas
 List of rivers of Oceania
 Lists of rivers

Africa
 
River